Social network aggregation is the process of collecting content from multiple social network services into a unified presentation. The task is often performed by a social network aggregator, such as Hootsuite or FriendFeed, which pulls together information into a single location, or helps a user consolidate multiple social networking profiles into a single profile. Various aggregation services provide tools or widgets to allow users to consolidate messages, track friends, combine bookmarks, search across multiple social networking sites, read RSS feeds for multiple social networks, see when their name is mentioned on various sites, access their profiles from a single interface, provide "livestreams," and so on. Social network aggregation services attempt to organize or simplify a user's social networking experience, although the idea has been satirized in the concept of a "social network aggregator aggregator."

There are other related uses of social media aggregators, aside from simplifying the user's social networking experiences. Some aggregators are designed to help companies and individuals improve engagement with their brands by creating aggregated social streams that can be embedded into an existing website and customized to look visually intrinsic to the site. This allows potential customers to interact with all the social media posts maintained by the brand without requiring them to jump from site to site. This has the benefit of keeping customers on the brand's site for a longer period.

Social network aggregators
Social network aggregation platforms allow members to share social network activities like Twitter, YouTube, StumbleUpon, Digg, or Delicious, with other major platforms. Content appears in real-time to other members who subscribe to a particular community, eliminating the need to jump from one social media network to another, trying to keep an eye on one's interests.

Social network aggregation systems can rely on initiation by publishers or by readers. In publisher-initiated aggregation systems, publishers combine identities, allowing their readers to see all aggregated content once subscribed. In reader-initiated systems, such as Windows Phone 7 People Hub and Linked Internet UI, readers combine identities, which has no impact on publishers or other readers; the publishers can still keep separate identities for different readers.

Technically, the aggregation is enabled by APIs provided by social networks. For the API to access a user's actions from another platform, the user must permit the social-aggregation platform by specifying the user-id and password of the social media to be syndicated. This concept resembles OpenID. In March 2008, The Economist reported that social network services are only just beginning the move away from "walled gardens" to more open architectures.  Some sites are working together on a "data portability workgroup," while others are focusing on a single sign-on system called OpenID to allow users to log on across multiple sites. Historically, the trend from private services to more open ones can be seen across many Internet services from email and instant messaging to the move that early online service providers made to become websites.  The OpenSocial initiative aims to bridge the member overlap between various online social network services.

Social network aggregators such as FriendFeed represent connections between people with directed graphs. They adopt the following approach, rather than a friending one, where "A follows B" does not imply "B follows A." Each account is then represented by a node whereas the following relationship is represented by an edge. The relationships between these nodes appear to be linked to their age and their sphere of influence. The nodes which have joined the network most recently get less influence than older ones. Therefore, on social network aggregators, new nodes tend to connect to nodes with high degrees.

A social media aggregator is a tool that helps users to discover and curate content from social media platforms into a single feed and gives them the option to display this feed across all marketing channels. Social media aggregators gather or "aggregate" existing social media posts from several social networks and combine them into a single feed. This social media feed then can be displayed on a website. While other types of media aggregators draw from many different sources and brands, a personal social feed aggregator like Juicer pulls content from social media accounts you own. You can find free social media aggregators as well as paid options that offer more features.

First social network aggregators
Historically, media aggregators have always existed. For example, journalists summarizing numerous pieces of information and trying to synthesize relevant content from many sources in an understandable way. The purpose is to provide understandable information for everyone about more or less complex topics, so that people will not have to spend hours finding and analyzing news from all around the world. Moreover, it was also an aggregator for job listings and other types of ads.

Collecting data in social network aggregation 
Performing social network aggregation requires a large range of data. First, the relevant content related to a topic and then the information about the profiles that have been reached by the content. The added value of social network aggregation is to analyze the data. They provide a correlation between the audience profiles (preferences, interests, age, location...) and the type of content. However, collecting such data may be difficult. Databases of social networks vary and may change during some updates.

Applications in marketing
Social network aggregators are a powerful tool in marketing. They appear to be an efficient way to have an organized view of the content to get a better insight into the market. The need for them is real: a study provided by eMarketer, shows that 43% of marketers complain about a significant lack of time to find relevant content for their business. Social network aggregators grant features to share your own content on many social media platforms to reach as many people as possible. That way, social network aggregators become a productivity enhancement tool.

Overlap between multiple social-network services
The attraction of social network aggregation comes from the fact that some users tend to use multiple social networks; they have accounts on several social networking sites. In November 2007, Alex Patriquin of Compete.com reported on the member overlap between various online social network services:

A study conducted in 2009 of 11,000 users
reported that the majority of MySpace, LinkedIn, and Twitter users also have Facebook accounts.

See also
 Crowdmapping
 List of social networking services
 Social media
 Social network
 Social network consolidator
 Social networking service
 Web 2.0
 Social bookmarking

Notes and references 

Social networks
Social network analysis
Social systems
Self-organization
Social bookmarking
News aggregators